John Hamilton "Chick" Henderson (9 February 1930 – 21 November 2006) was a South African rugby union footballer and commentator.

A native of Johannesburg, Henderson was educated at Michaelhouse, the University of the Witwatersrand and the University of Oxford. He played rugby for the Transvaal and Scotland and later became nationally known as a radio and subsequently television commentator. He was a founder member of The Quagga Rugby Club and Life President of the South African Barbarians.

He was also chairman of his engineering company.

Chick Henderson died in Johannesburg after a long illness caused by a heart condition. He was 76 years old.

External links 
 Planet Rugby
 Sunday Tribune article

1930 births
2006 deaths
Alumni of Michaelhouse
Alumni of the University of Oxford
Rugby union players from Johannesburg
Scotland international rugby union players
Scottish rugby union players
South African television journalists
Golden Lions players